HMAS Ararat (ACPB 89), named for the town of Ararat, Victoria, was an Armidale-class patrol boat of the Royal Australian Navy (RAN).

Design and construction

The semi-displacement vee hull is fabricated from aluminium alloy, and each vessel is built to a combination of Det Norske Veritas standards for high-speed light craft and RAN requirements.

The main armament of the Armidale class is a Rafael Typhoon stabilised  gun mount fitted with an M242 Bushmaster autocannon. Two  machine guns are also carried. Boarding operations are performed by two , waterjet propelled rigid-hulled inflatable boats (RHIBs). Each RHIB is stored in a dedicated cradle and davit, and is capable of operating independently from the patrol boat as it carries its own communications, navigation, and safety equipment.

Each patrol boat has a standard ship's company of 21 personnel, with a maximum of 29. A 20-berth auxiliary accommodation compartment was included in the design for the transportation of soldiers, illegal fishermen, or unauthorised arrivals; in the latter two cases, the compartment could be secured from the outside. However, a malfunction in the sewerage treatment facilities aboard  in August 2006 pumped hydrogen sulphide and carbon monoxide into the compartment, non-fatally poisoning four sailors working inside, after which use of the compartment for accommodation was banned across the class.

Ararat was constructed by Austal in Henderson, Western Australia. She was commissioned into the RAN in Melbourne on 10 November 2006.

Operational history
Ararat was assigned to Assail Division, is based in Darwin, and performed border protection and fisheries protection patrols.

This vessel participated in Exercises Triton Thunder and Cassowary during May 2012. Ararat operated off Dundee Beach in Darwin in concert with units from the Indonesian Navy and the RAN Fleet Air Arm.

The ship was decommissioned at HMAS Coonawarra on 2 July 2022.

Citations

References
Books

 The chapter is available separately as Semaphore, Issue 4, 2006 in PDF and HTML formats.

Journal and news articles

External links
Royal Australian Navy webpage for HMAS Ararat

Naval ships of Australia
Armidale-class patrol boats
Ships built by Austal
2006 ships